Sérgio Dias Branco (born 5 September 1977) is a film critic, film and television theorist, philosopher, theologian, and trade unionist. He is Assistant Professor of Film Studies at the University of Coimbra and a member of the Executive Board of the General Confederation of the Portuguese Workers (CGTP-IN), the largest trade union federation in Portugal.

Career
His teaching career in higher education began at the University of Kent, where he was awarded a PhD in film studies. He then taught at NOVA University Lisbon before moving to the University of Coimbra. He is the director of the MA in Art Studies and coordinator of LIPA - Laboratory for Investigating and Practicing Art at the University of Coimbra.

Research
Branco is a researcher at the Centre for 20th Century Interdisciplinary Studies (CEIS20) at the University of Coimbra, after leaving the NOVA Institute of Philosophy. He has been an invited member of the film criticism group "The Magnifying Class" at the University of Oxford, coordinated by Andrew Klevan. His research work focuses on the aesthetics and poetics of works of the moving image, in their relations with philosophy, history, Marxism and religion.

Journals
From 2010 to 2019, he was one of the editors of Cinema: Journal of Philosophy and the Moving Image. He co-edits Conversations: The Journal of Cavellian Studies, the only academic journal dedicated to the study and discussion of Stanley Cavell’s work.

Affiliations
He was elected for the Direction Board of the Association of Moving Image Researchers (AIM) between 2014 and 2020 and its president between 2018 and 2020. Branco is also a member of the Working-Class Studies Association since 2017 and of the European Network for Cinema and Media Studies and the Society for Cinema and Media Studies since 2011 and 2009, respectively.

Religion
A lay member of the Order of Preachers, Branco is a devout Catholic. He was received into the Lay Fraternity of Saint Dominic in Porto in 2012 and made his perpetual profession as a lay Dominican in 2017, in a Mass presided by the then Master of the Order, Bruno Cadoré, in Fatima.

Branco is a regular contributor for Pontos SJ, the portal of the Jesuits in Portugal.

Activism
Much of his political activism has to do with uniting the Left. As a trade unionist, he has been a member of the Teachers’ Union of the Centre Region and the National Federation of Teachers, acting in various capacities since 2014. In 2020, in the XIII Congress of the CGTP-IN, he was elected for the National Council and its Executive Board, a possibility previously disclosed by the press.

He is affiliated with the left-wing political association Democratic Intervention. Branco has run as a candidate for the Unitary Democratic Coalition.

Publications

Books
 O Trabalho das Imagens: Estudos sobre Cinema e Marxismo [The Work of Images: Studies on Cinema and Marxism]. Lisbon: Página a Página, 2020. [in Portuguese]
 Escrita em Movimento: Apontamentos Críticos sobre Filmes [Writing in Motion: Critical Notes on Films]. Lisbon: Documenta, 2020.  [in Portuguese]
 Por Dentro das Imagens: Obras de Cinema, Ideias do Cinema [Within Images: Film Works, Cinema Ideas]. Lisbon: Documenta, 2016.  [in Portuguese]

Selected edited journal issues
 Cinema: Journal of Philosophy and the Moving Image, no. 9, “Islam and Images” (with Patrícia Silveirinha Castello Branco and Saeed Zeydabadi-Nejad). 
 Cinema: Journal of Philosophy and the Moving Image, no. 8, “Marx’s Philosophy” (with Michael Wayne). 
 Cinema: Journal of Philosophy and the Moving Image, no. 4, “Philosophy of Religion”.

Selected articles and book chapters 
 “The Urban and the Domestic: Spaces of American Film Noir”. In New Approaches to Cinematic Spaces, ed. Filipa Rosário and Iván Villarmea Álvarez, pp. 85–96. London: Routledge, 2018. 
 “The Past Tense of Our Selves: Um Adeus Português in 1980s Portugal”. Journal of Lusophone Studies, vol. 2, no. 1, "Special Dossier on Portuguese Cinema", ed. Clara Rowland and Estela Vieira, pp. 41–58. 
 “Sembène, Ousmane (1923-2007)”. In The Palgrave Encyclopedia of Imperialism and Anti-Imperialism, Vol. I, ed. Immanuel Ness and Zack Cope, pp. 218–222. Basingstoke: Palgrave Macmillan, 2016. 
 "Kino Kino Kino Kino Kino: Guy Maddin’s Cinema of Artifice". L’Atalante: Revista de estudios cinematográficos, no. 19, coord. Pablo Hernández Miñano and Violeta Martín Núñez, pp. 105–10. Valencia: University of Valencia, 2015. 
 “Situating Comedy: Duration and Inhabitation in Classical American Sitcoms”. In Television Aesthetics and Style, ed. Jason Jacobs and Steven Peacock, pp. 93–102. New York: Bloomsbury, 2013.

References

External links
 Sérgio Dias Branco’s faculty page at University of Coimbra
 Sérgio Dias Branco’s personal page

1977 births
Catholic socialists
Film theorists
Lay Dominicans
Marxist writers
Portuguese film critics
Portuguese Roman Catholics
Portuguese trade unionists
Christian communists
Academic staff of the University of Coimbra
Alumni of the University of Kent
University of Lisbon alumni
Living people